The Malaya Command was a formation of the British Army formed in the 1920s for the coordination of the defences of British Malaya, which comprised the Straits Settlements, the Federated Malay States and the Unfederated Malay States. It consisted mainly of small garrison forces in Kuala Lumpur, Penang, Taiping, Seremban and Singapore.

With the outbreak of the Second World War in 1939, the command reinforced its strength in anticipation of an attack. With the bulk of British forces being tied down in Europe and North Africa, the command was mainly augmented by units from India.

On 18 November 1940, the command was placed under the command of the British Far East Command and later, on 7 January 1942, under the short-lived South West Pacific Command or ABDACOM, which was tasked to maintain control of the "Malay Barrier" (or "East Indies Barrier"), a notional line running down the Malayan Peninsula, through Singapore and the southernmost islands of the Dutch East Indies. The command was disbanded on 15 February 1942 with the surrender of all Commonwealth forces in the conclusion of the Battle of Singapore.

With the Surrender of Japan, the command was re-formed from the 14th Army with its HQ based in Singapore on 1 November 1945. The command was divided and downgraded to the Malaya District and Singapore District in August 1947 but was upgraded again into a full command in August 1950 due to the Malayan Emergency.

With the independence of Malaya on 31 August 1957, the command was disbanded and succeeded by Overseas Commonwealth Land Forces (Malaya).

Formation and Structure
In November 1940, the total strength of Malaya Command was 17 battalions. The Indian Army contingent was mainly organised as III Corps with their HQ based in Kuala Lumpur.

When Japanese forces invaded Malaya on 8 December 1941, Lieutenant-General Arthur Percival, the General Officer Commanding (GOC) Malaya in charge of Malaya Command, with a force of 88,600 faced the 70,000 strong Twenty Fifth Army of the Imperial Japanese Army under the command of General Tomoyuki Yamashita.

Allied Land Forces (8 December 1941)
As of 8 December 1941

Indian III Corps
 As of 7 December 1941
Commanding Officer III Indian Corps – Lt Gen Lewis Heath
 Indian 9th Infantry Division
Maj-Gen Arthur Barstow (28 January 1942 at Layang-Layang near Bota)
HQ: Kuala Lumpur
8th Indian Infantry Brigade
Brig Bethold Key
HQ: Kota Bharu
2nd Battalion, 10th Baluch Regiment – Lt. Col. John Griffeth Frith
2nd Battalion, 12th Frontier Force Regiment – Lt. Col. Arthur Cumming
1st Battalion, 13th Frontier Force Rifles – Lt. Col. Clarence Gilbert
3rd Battalion, 17th Dogra Regiment – Lt. Col. George Allen Preston
21st Mountain Battery, Indian Artillery – Major John Bertram Sopper
19th Field Company (Royal Bombay Sappers and Miners) - Major M. Delmé Radcliffe RE

22nd Indian Infantry Brigade
Brig Gordon Painter
HQ: Kuantan
5th Battalion, 11th Sikh Regiment – Lt. Col. John Henry Devereux Parkin
2nd Battalion, 18th Royal Garhwal Rifles – Lt. Col. Guy Edward Ross Stewart Hartigan MC
5th Field Regiment, Royal Artillery – Lt. Col. Edward William Francis Jephson
22nd Field Company (Royal Bombay Sappers and Miners) - Major H.T. Heard RE

Command Troops
 4th Battalion, Federated Malay States Volunteer Forces (Pahang) – Lt. Col. James Oliphant Mackellar (d.12 March 1945)
88th (2nd West Lancashire) Field Regiment RA – Lt. Col. Sylvain Claude D'Aubuz
42nd Field Park Company (Royal Bombay Sappers and Miners)- Major Thomas Wilfried Nash
 Indian 11th Infantry Division
Maj-Gen David Murray-Lyon/Brig Archibald Paris/Maj-Gen Berthold Wells Key
HQ: Sungai Petani
6th Indian Infantry Brigade
Brig William Oswald Lay/Lt. Col. Henry Sloane Larkin
HQ: Jitra
2nd Battalion, East Surrey Regiment – Lt. Col. George Edward Swinton
1st Battalion, 8th Punjab Regiment – Lt. Col. Ronald Charles Sidney Bates (12 December 1941)
2nd Battalion, 16th Punjab Regiment – Lt. Col. Henry Sloane Larkin (Died as a POW on 1 January 1944)
22nd Mountain Artillery Regiment, Royal Artillery – Lt. Col. George Leonard Hughes
3rd Field Company (King George V's Bengal Sappers and Miners) - Major A.R. Beattie RE

15th Indian Infantry Brigade (III Corps Reserve)
Brig Kenneth Alfred Garrett/Brig. William St.John Carpendale
HQ: Jitra
1st Battalion, Leicestershire Regiment – Lt. Col. Charles Esmond Morrison
2nd Battalion, 9th Jat Regiment – Lt. Col. Charles Knowler Tester
1st Battalion, 14th Punjab Regiment – Lt. Col. Leslie Vernon "James" Fitzpatrick
23rd Field Company (Royal Bombay Sappers and Miners) - Major John Eglington Bate RE

28th (Gurkha) Infantry Brigade
Brig William St J. Carpendale/Lt. Col. Wallace Raymond Selby
HQ: Ipoh
2nd Battalion, 1st Gurkha Rifles – Lt. Col. John Oswald "Jack" Fulton (8 January 1942 at Slim River)
2nd Battalion, 2nd Gurkha Rifles – Lt. Col. Geoffrey Harley Douglas Woollcombe (Died Indian Ocean, 28 Feb. 1942)
2nd Battalion, 9th Gurkha Rifles – Lt. Col. Wallace Raymond Selby/Lt. Col. Maurice Bryer Allsebrook DSO MC
17th Field Company (Royal Bombay Sappers and Miners) - Major N.S. Bhagat – IE

11th Division Command Troops
3rd Cavalry (IA) – Lt. Col. Julian Gerald Barnes De Wilton
137th (2nd West Lancashire) Field Regiment, Royal Artillery – Lt. Col. Gilbert Daly Holmes ( at Slim River)
155th (Lanarkshire Yeomanry) Field Regiment, Royal Artillery – Lt. Col. Alan Murdoch ( at Slim River)
80th Anti-Tank Regiment, Royal Artillery – Lt. Col. William E.S. Napier
85th Anti-Tank Regiment, Royal Artillery – Lt. Col. A.J. Lardner-Clarke - arrived Singapore 13 January 1942
1st Independent Company – Major Sheppard Percy Fearon
43rd Field Park Company, (King George V's Bengal Sappers and Miners)

Krohcol
Lt. Col. Henry Dawson Moorhead
5th Battalion, 14th Punjab Regiment (3 Companies) – Lt. Col. Cyril Lovesy Lawrence Stokes ( in captivity on 15th February 1942 following the Battle of Slim River) 
3rd Battalion, 16th Punjab Regiment – Lt. Col. Henry Dawson Moorehead ( at Battle of Muar)
2/3rd Australian Motor Company - Capt. George Arthur Carrick Kiernan
 Line of Communications Brigade
Brig Robert Gifford Moir
1st Battalion, Federated Malay States Volunteer Forces (Perak) - Lt Col. J.E.G. "Jim" Staley
2nd Battalion, Federated Malay States Volunteer Forces (Selangor) - Lt. Col. W.M. "Jimmie" James
3rd Battalion, Federated Malay States Volunteer Forces (Negeri Sembilan) – Lt. Col. C.F.H. Riches
1st (Light) Field Regiment, Federated Malay States Volunteer Forces (Equipped 4 x 3.7" How)
Armoured Car Squadron, Federated Malay States Volunteer Forces (Equipped 9 Armoured Cars) – Major C.E. Collinge
Signals Battalion, Federated Malay States Volunteer Forces - Lt. Col. Stanley P. Moreton
 Fortress Penang
Brig Cyril Arthur Lyon
HQ: Penang
D Company, 5th Battalion, 14th Punjab Regiment - Lieutenant Edward John Ellis
3rd Battalion, Straits Settlements Volunteer Force (Penang and Province Wellesley Volunteer Corps) - Lt. Col. The Hon Ernest De Buriatte
11th Coast Regiment, Royal Artillery – Lt. Col. M.L. More
2nd Anti-Aircraft Regiment, Indian Artillery
 Support Units
5th Battalion, 14th Punjab Regiment (assigned to Krohcol) - Lt. Col. Cyril Lovesy Lawrence Stokes ( in captivity on 15th February 1942 following the Battle of Slim River) 
3rd Battalion, 16th Punjab Regiment (assigned to Krohcol) – Lt. Col. Henry Moorhead ( at Battle of Muar)
1st Battalion, Mysore Infantry (Indian States Forces) – Lt. Col. Kenneth Harvey Preston
1st Battalion, Bahawalpur Infantry (Indian States Forces) – Lt. Col. Harry Ernest Tyrell
1st Battalion, Hyderabad Regiment (Indian States Forces) – Lt. Col. Charles Albert Hendrick (10 December 1941 at Kota Bharu)
11th Indian Division Signal Regiment
 Corps Troops
 45 Army Troops Company  (Royal Bombay Sappers and Miners)
46 Army Troops Company (Queen Victoria’s Own Madras Sappers and Miners)
1 Artisan Works Company  (Royal Bombay Sappers and Miners)

Australian 8th Division
 Australian 8th Division
Maj Gen Gordon Bennett
HQ: Kluang

 2/10th Field Regiment (Equipped 8 × 18-Pdr and 16 × 4.5" How. / re-equipped with 24 × 25-Pdr between 9–12 January 1942) - Lt.Col. A.W. Walsh
 2/15th Field Regiment (Equipped 24 × 25-Pdr) - Lt. Col. J.W. Wright
4th Anti-Tank Regiment (Equipped 12 × 2-Pdr / 24 × 75mm) – Lt. Col. Cranston Albury McEachern
2/10th Field Company - Major K.P.H Lawrence
2/12th Field Company - Major J.A.L. Shaw
2/6th Field Park Company - Capt. T.T. Lewis
 Australian 22nd Brigade
Brig Harold Burfield Taylor
HQ: Mersing – Endau
2/18th Australian Infantry Battalion – Lt. Col. Arthur Varley (Died as POW 13 September 1944)
2/19th Australian Infantry Battalion – Lt. Col. Charles Anderson VC
2/20th Australian Infantry Battalion – Lt. Col. Charles Frederick Assheton (12 February 1942)
 Australian 27th Brigade
Brig Duncan Maxwell
HQ: Kluang
2/26th Australian Infantry Battalion – Lt. Col. Arthur Harold Boyes (12 February 1942)/Richard Oakes
2/29th Australian Infantry Battalion – Lt. Col. John Charles Robertson (18 Jan. 1942 during Battle of Muar)/ Lt. Col. Pond
2/30th Australian Infantry Battalion – Lt. Col. Frederick Gallagher "Jack" Galleghan

Fortress Singapore
Commanding Officer – Maj Gen Frank Keith Simmons
HQ: Singapore
 Fortress Singapore Division
Maj Gen F. K. Simmons

1st Malaya Brigade
Brig George Giffard Rawson Williams
2nd Battalion, Loyal Regiment (North Lancashire) – Lt. Col. Mordaunt Elrington
1st Battalion, Malay Regiment – Lt. Col. James Richard Glencoe André
2nd Battalion, Malay Regiment – Lt. Col. Frederick Walter Young

2nd Malaya Brigade
Brig Francis Hugh Fraser
1st Battalion, Manchester Regiment – Lt. Col. Edward Barclay Holmes
2nd Battalion, Gordon Highlanders – Lt. Col. John Heslop Stitt/Richard Gilbert Lees
2nd Battalion, 17th Dogra Regiment – Lt. Col. Sidney Clermont Scott

Straits Settlements Volunteer Force Brigade
Col Francis Reginald Grimwood
1st Battalion, Straits Settlements Volunteer Force (Singapore Volunteer Corps) – Lt. Col. Thomas Henry Newey
2nd Battalion, Straits Settlements Volunteer Force (Singapore Volunteer Corps) - Lt. Col. Donald G. Macleod
4th Battalion, Straits Settlements Volunteer Force (Malacca Volunteer Corps) – Lt. Col. Charles Alexander Scott
Singapore Armoured Car Company, Straits Settlements Volunteer Force

Royal Engineers Brigade
Brig Ivan Simson
30th Fortress Company, Royal Engineers
34th Fortress Company, Royal Engineers
35th Fortress Company, Royal Engineers
41st Fortress Company, Royal Engineers

Artillery
Commander, Air Defences, Singapore – Brig Alec Warren Greenlaw Wildey
1st (Heavy) Anti-Aircraft Regiment, Indian Artillery - Lt. Col. John Rowley Williamson DSO
1st Heavy Anti-Aircraft Regiment, Hong Kong and Singapore Royal Artillery - Lt. Col. Archer Edwards Tawney
2nd Heavy Anti-Aircraft Regiment, Hong Kong and Singapore Royal Artillery – Lt. Col. Howard Wincent Allpres
3rd Light Anti-Aircraft Regiment, Hong Kong and Singapore Royal Artillery - Lt. Col. Denis Vivian Hill
3rd Heavy Anti-Aircraft Regiment, Royal Artillery - Lt. Col. Francis Edgar Hugonin
5th Searchlight Regiment, Royal Artillery – Lt. Col. R.A.O. Clarke
Commander, Fixed Defences, Singapore – Brigadier A.D. Curtis
7th Coast Regiment, Royal Artillery – Lt. Col. Hereward Douglas St. George Cardew
9th Coast Regiment, Royal Artillery – Lt. Col. Charles Philip Heath
16th Defence Regiment, Royal Artillery – Lt. Col. M.S.H. Maxwell-Gumbleton

Support Units
Half Strength Jind Infantry Battalion (Indian States Forces) (½ Strength) – Lt. Col. Gurbaksh Singh
Half Strength Kapurthala Infantry Battalion (Indian States Forces) (½ Strength) - Major Aziz Ahmad
Dalforce – Lt. Col. John Dalley

Malaya Command Reserve
Commanding Officer: Brig.A.C.M. Paris/Lt. Col. I.M. Stewart
HQ: Port Dickson
12th Indian Infantry Brigade – Brig.A.C.M. Paris/Lt. Col. I.M. Stewart
HQ: Port Dickson
2nd Battalion, Argyll and Sutherland Highlanders – Lt. Col. I.M.Stewart/ Lt. Col. Lindsay Robertson ( 20 January 1942)
5th Battalion, 2nd Punjab Regiment – Lt. Col. Cecil Deakin
4th Battalion, 19th Hyderabad Regiment – Lt. Col. Eric Lawrence Wilson-Haffenden/Lt. Col. Herbert Lawrence Hill
122nd (West Riding) Field Regiment, Royal Artillery – Lt. Col. George St.John Armitage Dyson ( 22 November 1942)
15 Field Company (Queen Victoria’s Own Madras Sappers and Miners) - Major R. B. Muir RE

Sarawak Force (SARFOR)
Commanding Officer: Lt-Col Charles Malet Lane
HQ: Kuching
SARFOR
Lt-Col C. M. Lane
HQ: Kuching
2nd Battalion, 15th Punjab Regiment – (this battalion took part in the Battle of Borneo where it surrendered).
Sarawak Coastal Marine Service
Sarawak Volunteer Corps
Sarawak Rangers
Sarawak Armed Police
35th Fortress Company, Royal Engineers
6" Guns Battery, Hong Kong and Singapore Royal Artillery

Christmas Island
Commanding Officer: Capt Leonard Walter Thomas Williams
HQ: Christmas Island
 6" Gun, Hong Kong and Singapore Royal Artillery

Reinforcements

Arrived January 3rd 1942 – February 5th 1942
In addition to the units listed below a number of replacement drafts were sent to Singapore on convoys MS2 from Melbourne arriving 24/1/1942 and  BM12 from Bombay arriving 5/2/1942

44th Indian Infantry Brigade - (Arrived 25-Jan-1942 Convoy BM10) – Brigadier George Cecil Ballentine
6th Battalion, 1st Punjab Regiment – Lt. Col. James Dow Sainter MC
7th Battalion, 8th Punjab Regiment – Lt. Col. Willis Southern
6th Battalion, 14th Punjab Regiment -  Lt. Col. Louis Sobaux Ingle MC

45th Indian Infantry Brigade - (Arrived 3-Jan-1942 Convoy BM9A) – Brigadier Herbert Cecil Duncan ( at Battle of Muar)
7th Battalion, 6th Rajputana Rifles  - Lt. Col. James Albert Lewis ( at Battle of Muar)
4th Battalion, 9th Jat Regiment – Lt. Col. John Whittaker Williams ( at Battle of Muar)
5th Battalion, 18th Royal Garhwal Rifles – Lt. Col. James H.C. Woolridge ( at Battle of Muar)
13th Indian Auxiliary Pioneer Battalion
 13th Indian Field Company (Madras Sappers and Miners) (Arrived 3-Jan-1942 Convoy BM9A) - Major B.E. Whitman RE
 100th Light Tank Squadron (Arrived 29-Jan-1942 Convoy BM11) – Major Jack Alford ( 12 Feb 1942) equipped Carden Lloyd Tankettes

18th Infantry Division – Major-General Merton Beckwith-Smith
53rd Infantry Brigade - (Arrived 13 January 1942 Convoy DM1) – Brig. Cecil Leonard Basil Duke
5th Battalion, Royal Norfolk Regiment – Lt. Col. Eric Charles Prattley
6th Battalion, Royal Norfolk Regiment – Lt. Col. Ian Conway Gilford Lywood ( at Alexandra Hospital Massacre)
2nd Battalion, Cambridgeshire Regiment – Lt. Col. Gordon Calthorpe Thorne (Died, Indian Ocean while attempting to escape)

54th Infantry Brigade - (Arrived 29 January 1942 Convoy BM11) – Brig. Edward Henry Walford Backhouse
4th Battalion, Royal Norfolk Regiment – Lt. Col. Alfred Ernest Knights
4th Battalion, Suffolk Regiment – Lt. Col. Alec Albert Johnson
5th Battalion, Suffolk Regiment – Lt. Col. Lionel John Baker

55th Infantry Brigade - (Arrived 29 January 1942 Convoy BM11) – Brig. Tristram Hugh "Tim" Massy-Beresford
5th Battalion, Bedfordshire and Hertfordshire Regiment – Lt. Col. Douglas Rhys Thomas
1/5th Battalion, Sherwood Foresters – Lt. Col. Harold Hutchinson Lilly
1st Battalion, Cambridgeshire Regiment – Lt. Col. Gerald Goodwin Carpenter

Divisional Troops
9th Battalion, Royal Northumberland Fusiliers (Machine Gun Battalion) - (Arrived 5-Feb-1942 Convoy BM12) – Lt. Col. Lechmere Cay Thomas
18th Reconnaissance Battalion, Reconnaissance Corps 5th Battalion Loyal Regiment (North Lancashire) - (Arrived 5 February 1942 Convoy BM12) – Lt. Col. Henry Arnold Fitt

Royal Artillery
118th (8th London) Field Regiment, Royal Artillery (TA) - (Arrived 29 January 1942 Convoy BM11) – Lt. Col. C.E.Mackellar
135th (East Anglian) (Hertfordshire Yeomanry) Field Regiment, Royal Artillery - (Arrived 13 January 1942 Convoy DM1) – Lt. Col. Philip Toosey
148th (Bedfordshire Yeomanry) Field Regiment, Royal Artillery - (Arrived 29 January 1942 Convoy BM11) – Lt. Col. S.W.Harris
85th Anti-Tank Regiment, Royal Artillery - (Arrived 13 January 1942 Convoy DM1) – Lt. Col. Andrew John Lardner-Clarke
125th (Northumbrian) Anti-Tank Regiment, Royal Artillery - (Arrived 5 February 1942 Convoy BM12) – Lt. Col. James Dean
35th Light Anti-Aircraft Regiment, Royal Artillery (144th Battery and part of 89th Battery) (Arrived 13 January 1942 Convoy DM1) – Lt. Col. John Bassett
6th Heavy Anti-Aircraft Regiment, Royal Artillery (part) (Arrived 13 January 1942 Convoy DM1)– Lt. Col. G.W.G Baass

Royal Army Medical Corps
186th Field Ambulance
196th Field Ambulance
197th Field Ambulance (Arrived 5 February 1942 Convoy BM12)

Royal Engineers
287th Field Company
288th Field Company
560th Field Company
251st Field Park Company (Arrived 5-Feb-1942 Convoy BM12)

 Australian
 2/4th Machine Gun Battalion (Arrived 24 January 1942 Convoy MS2) – Lt. Col. M.J.Anketell  (Feb. 1942)

Allied Air Force units in Malaya December 1941
There were 161 front line aircraft, including three Royal Netherlands Air Force Catalina flying boats, based in Malaya and on Singapore Island on 8 December 1941. These units came under the control of Far East Air Force (Royal Air Force) under the command of Air Vice Marshal C.W.H.Pulford until February 1942 when Air Vice Marshal P.C.Maltby took command.

Based on Singapore Island

 RAF Seletar;
 No. 36 Squadron RAF – 6 × Vickers Vildebeest
 No. 100 Squadron RAF – 12 × Vickers Vildebeest
 No. 205 Squadron RAF – 3 × PBY Catalina
 RAF Tengah;
 No. 34 Squadron RAF – 16 × Bristol Blenheim IV
 RAF Sembawang;
 No. 453 Squadron RAAF – 16 × Brewster Buffalo
 RAF Kallang;
 No. 243 Squadron RAF – 14 × Brewster Buffalo
 No. 488 Squadron RNZAF – 16 × Brewster Buffalo

Based in Northern Malaya
 Sungei Patani;
 No. 21 Squadron RAAF – 12 × Brewster Buffalo
 No. 27 Squadron RAF – 12 × Bristol Blenheim I
 RAF Kota Bharu;
 No. 1 Squadron RAAF – 12 × Lockheed Hudson
 Detachment from No. 243 Squadron RAF – 2 × Brewster Buffalo
 Gong Kedak;
 Detachment from No. 36 Squadron RAF – 6 × Vickers Videbeest
 RAF Kuantan;
 No. 8 Squadron RAAF – 12 × Lockheed Hudson
 No. 60 Squadron RAF – 8 × Bristol Blenheim
 Alor Star;
 No. 62 Squadron RAF – 11 × Bristol Blenheim

Commanders-in-Chief
Commanders-in-Chief have included:

GOC Troops in the Straits Settlements
 until early 1900: Major-General John Baillie Ballantyne Dickson
 1903–1905 Major-General Arthur Dorward
 1905–1907 Major-General Inigo Jones
 1907–1910 Major-General Thomas Perrott
 1910–1914 Major-General Theodore Stephenson
 1914–1915 Major-General Raymond Reade
 1915–1921 Major-General Sir Dudley Ridout
 1921–1924 Major-General Sir Neill Malcolm
GOC Malaya Command
 1924–1927 Major-General Sir Theodore Fraser
 1927–1929 Major-General Sir Casimir van Straubenzee
 1929–1931 Major-General Harry Pritchard
 1931–1934 Major-General Sir Louis Oldfield
 1934–1935 Major-General Ernest Lewin
 1935–1939 Major-General Sir William Dobbie
 1939–1941 Lieutenant-General Sir Lionel Bond
 1941–1942 Lieutenant-General Arthur Percival
Note from 1943 to 1945 Malaya was under Japanese control
 Nov–Dec 1945 Lieutenant-General Sir Miles Dempsey
 1945–1946 Lieutenant-General Sir Frank Messervy
 1946–1947 Lieutenant-General Sir Alexander Galloway
GOC Malaya District
 1947–1948 Major-General Ashton Wade
 1948–1950 Major-General Sir Charles Boucher
GOC Malaya
 1950–1952 Major-General Roy Urquhart
 1952–1954 Major-General Sir Hugh Stockwell
 1954–1956 Lieutenant-General Sir Geoffrey Bourne
 1956–1957 Lieutenant-General Sir Roger Bower

See also
 Japanese Order of Battle, Malayan Campaign

Notes

References

Further reading
 Order of Battle Site for Malaya Command
 2nd Site Malaya Order of Battle
 The War In Malaya – Lt General A E Percival
 TracesOfWar.com – Malaya Command
 The Singapore-convoys (netherlandsnavy.nl)

British Malaya
Commands of the British Army
Military of Singapore under British rule
Military history of Malaysia
Military units and formations established in 1924
Military units and formations disestablished in 1957
1924 establishments in British Malaya
1957 disestablishments in Malaya
British Malaya in World War II
Military history of Malaya during World War II
Military history of Singapore during World War II
World War II orders of battle